Urodeta is a genus of moths of the family Elachistidae. The genus was originally assigned to the family Momphidae.

Species
Urodeta absidata Sruoga & J. de Prins, 2011
Urodeta acerba Sruoga & J. de Prins, 2011
Urodeta acinacella J. de Prins & Sruoga, 2012
Urodeta aculeata Sruoga & J. de Prins, 2011
Urodeta bucera Sruoga & J. de Prins, 2011
Urodeta crenata Sruoga & J. de Prins, 2011
Urodeta cuspidis Sruoga & J. de Prins, 2011
Urodeta falciferella (Sruoga & De Prins, 2009) (previously in Perittia)
Urodeta faro Sruoga & J. de Prins, 2011
Urodeta gnoma (Sruoga & De Prins, 2009) (previously in Perittia)
Urodeta hibernella (Staudinger 1859)
Urodeta inusta Kaila, 2011
Urodeta maculata (Mey, 2007) (previously in Phthinostoma)
Urodeta noreikai Sruoga & De Prins, 2013
Urodeta quadrifida J. de Prins & Sruoga, 2012
Urodeta spatulata (Sruoga & De Prins, 2009) (previously in Perittia)
Urodeta taeniata (Mey, 2007) (previously in Phthinostoma)
Urodeta talea Sruoga & J. de Prins, 2011
Urodeta tantilla (Sruoga & De Prins, 2009) (previously in Perittia)
Urodeta tortuosa Sruoga & J. de Prins, 2011
Urodeta trilobata J. de Prins & Sruoga, 2012

References

, 2011: Elachistine Moths of Australia: Lepidoptera, Gelechioidea, Elachistidae.
, 2011: New species of Elachistinae (Lepidoptera: Elachistidae) from Cameroon and the Democratic Republic of the Congo. Zootaxa 3008: 1-32. Abstract: .

Elachistidae
Moth genera